Ledzokuku is one of the constituencies represented in the Parliament of Ghana. It elects one Member of Parliament (MP) by the first past the post system of election. Ledzokuku is located in the Dangme East District of the Greater Accra Region of Ghana. The municipality is bounded to the south by the Gulf of Guinea (from the Kpeshie Lagoon to the Sakumono Junction). It continues along the railway line through Sakumono to the ‘on the run’ traffic light. It is bounded to the East by the Spintex Road towards the Coca-Cola Roundabout. This turns to the left and right by Johnson Wax. To the north of the boundary is the Motorway through to the Tetteh Quarshie Interchange and moves south along the boundaries of the Ashitey Akomfra Electoral area and towards the estuary of the Kpeshie lagoon. The constituency is home to one of the main major hospitals in Accra, the Lekma hospital.

Members of Parliament

Elections

See also
List of Ghana Parliament constituencies

References 

Parliamentary constituencies in the Greater Accra Region